Nathan Silcock (first ¼ 1904 – fourth ¼ 1967) was an English professional rugby league footballer who played in the 1920s and 1930s.

Background
Nat Silcock's birth was registered in West Derby, (Liverpool), Lancashire, and his death aged 63 was registered in Widnes, Lancashire, England.

Playing career

International honours
Nat Silcock represented Rugby League XIII while at Widnes in 1934 against France, and in 1935 against France, won caps for England while at Widnes in 1932 against Wales (2 matches), in 1933 against Australia, in 1934 against Australia, and France, in 1935 against Wales, and in 1936 against Wales, and France, and won caps for Great Britain while at Widnes in 1932 against Australia (2 matches), and New Zealand (2 matches), in 1933 against Australia (3 matches), in 1936 against Australia (3 matches), and in 1937 against Australia (2 matches).

County honours
Nat Silcock played left-, i.e. number 8, in Lancashire's 7-5 victory over Australia in the 1937–38 Kangaroo tour of Great Britain and France match at Wilderspool Stadium, Warrington on Wednesday 29 September 1937, in front of a crowd of 16,250.

Challenge Cup Final appearances
Nat Silcock played  in Widnes' 10-3 victory over St. Helens in the 1929–30 Challenge Cup Final during the 1929–30 season at Wembley Stadium, London in front of a crowd of 36,544, played  in the 5-11 defeat by Hunslet in the 1933–34 Challenge Cup Final during the 1933–34 season at Wembley Stadium, London on Saturday 5 May 1934, and played, was captain, and scored the fourth try in the 18-5 victory over Keighley in the 1936–37 Challenge Cup Final during the 1936–37 season at Wembley Stadium, London on Saturday 8 May 1937.

County Cup Final appearances
Nat Silcock played right-, i.e. number 10,  in Widnes' 4-5 defeat by Wigan in the 1928–29 Lancashire County Cup Final during the 1928–29 season at Wilderspool Stadium, Warrington on Saturday 24 November 1928.

Family details
Nat Silcock's marriage to Mary A. (née, Andrews) was registered during fourth ¼ 1926 in Prescot district. They had children; the future rugby league footballer, Nat Silcock Jr., and Violet Silcock (birth registered during fourth ¼ 1929 in Prescot district).

References

External links
Statistics at rugby.widnes.tv
Hall of Fame at rugby.widnes.tv

1904 births
1967 deaths
England national rugby league team players
English rugby league players
Great Britain national rugby league team players
Lancashire rugby league team players
People from West Derby
Place of death missing
Rugby league players from Liverpool
Rugby league props
Rugby league second-rows
Rugby League XIII players
Widnes Vikings captains
Widnes Vikings players